Driskill Mountain (also referred to as Mount Driskill) is the highest natural summit in Louisiana, with an elevation of  above sea level. A large pile of rocks marks the high point.

Description
Driskill Mountain is a landform created by the erosion of unlithified Paleogene sediment. Its summit consists of nonmarine quartz sands of the Cockfield Formation. These sands overlie shallow marine and coastal clays, silts, and sands of the Cook Mountain Formation, which form the bulk of Driskill Mountain.

Mountaintop flora include wild azalea and dogwood.

History
James Christopher Driskill, the person for whom Driskill Mountain was named, was born in Henry County, Georgia, on June 27, 1817. In 1840, he married the former Eugenia Irwin Walker. In October 1859,  Driskill sold his land in Troup County, Georgia, and moved his family, which by then consisted of his wife, eight boys, and one girl, to Louisiana. By December 1859, Driskill had purchased in Louisiana , which included Driskill Mountain. During the American Civil War, Driskill served in the Home Guard. His eldest son, William B. Driskill, was killed in action at the Battle of the Wilderness in Virginia on May 5, 1864. Another one of his sons, James B. Driskill, disappeared after he had left Louisiana to fight in the Civil War. Except for one son and daughter, Driskill's family remained in  Bienville Parish, and his descendants still live in the area.

Jimmie Davis and his band played You Are My Sunshine at the summit. Davis became governor of Louisiana just five years after the performance and the song became the state song of Louisiana.

See also
 
 
 
 List of U.S. states by elevation

References

External links
 
 Driskill Mountain
 Driskill Mountain, the Highest Point in Louisiana

Landforms of Bienville Parish, Louisiana
Mountains of Louisiana
Landmarks in Louisiana
Highest points of U.S. states
Tourist attractions in Bienville Parish, Louisiana